Mary, Lady Bailey,  (née Westenra; 1 December 1890 – 29 July 1960) was an Anglo-Irish aviator. She was known as one of the finest aviatrices of her time, who '"personally guided a plane from England to the nether tip of South Africa and back" (Time, 28 January 1930).

Early life 

The daughter of Derrick Warner William Westenra, 5th Baron Rossmore, of Rossmore Castle, County Monaghan and his wife, Mittie (née Naylor).

Lady Bailey spent most of her childhood in Ireland where she was home schooled until she ran away in 1906. Adventurous from a young age, she apparently bought a motorbike in her youth and was gaining a reputation for speeding in cars by 1914.

Aviation 

During the First World War, Mary volunteered as an aviation mechanic and served in Britain and France, associated with the Royal Flying Corps.

She was awarded a pilot's licence in early 1927 and quickly started a sporting career. She became the first woman to fly across the Irish Sea.

Between 9 March and 30 April 1928, Bailey made an  solo flight from Croydon to Cape Town, flying a de Havilland DH.60 Cirrus Moth with an extra fuel tank. She then made the  journey back between September 1928 and 16 January 1929.

The return journey involved flying across the Congo, then along the southern edge of the Sahara and up the west coast of Africa, then across Spain and France back home again. It was the longest solo flight and longest flight accomplished by a woman that far. This feat won her the 1929 Britannia Trophy.

In 1927 and 1928 she twice won the Harmon Trophy as the world's outstanding aviatrix. She also participated in the Challenge International de Tourisme 1929, which she completed off the contest, and Challenge International de Tourisme 1930, in which she took 31st place for 60 participants, being one of only two women.

In 1930 she held a seat on the Women's Engineering Society Council. In 1931, she became a member of a group of female pioneers for science, the members of which shared her adventurous and determined spirit. That same year Bailey became the first woman in the United Kingdom to obtain a Certificate for Blind Flying.

Bailey also attained the rank of Section Officer in the Women's Auxiliary Air Force, during World War II.

Contributions to Archaeology 
Lady  Bailey was also able to use her talents for aviation to take aerial photographs of important archaeological sites. She was very likely the first woman to accomplish this during her work in February 1931 on the Kharga Oasis project in Egypt. Working closely with Gertrude Caton-Thompson and Elinor Wight Gardner, Bailey was able to take aerial photographs which presented an expansive overview of the archaeological site within just two weeks. These photographs accomplished what would have taken far longer to do on foot. In addition, there also revealed future excavation sites. Indeed, Lady Bailey's valuable contribution to the Kharga Oasis expedition was both innovative and impressive.

Honours 

In January 1930 she was appointed Dame Commander of the Order of the British Empire (DBE).

Family
She married Abe Bailey on 5 September 1911, being his second wife; they had five children.

Sources

Lady Mary Bailey profile

References

1890 births
1960 deaths
Dames Commander of the Order of the British Empire
Daughters of barons
British aviators
Harmon Trophy winners
Women's Auxiliary Air Force officers
People from County Monaghan
Britannia Trophy winners
Place of death missing
British women aviators
British aviation record holders
Irish women aviators
Wives of baronets
Wives of knights 
British women aviation record holders
Women's Engineering Society